Sent by Ravens was a Christian post-hardcore band from Hartsville, South Carolina. Their debut EP was released in 2007, and they have since released a following EP and two full-length albums. They take their name from 1 Kings 17:6, a verse that references Elijah receiving bread and meat from ravens while in the wilderness.

History
Sent by Ravens was formed in January 2006 by James (Jamie) Windham (bass), Andy O'Neal (guitar) and Zach Riner (vocals). In August 2007, while searching for a drummer, Windham found Dane Andersen through a video he posted of himself playing on YouTube. Andersen in turn recommended his friend James "JJ" Leonard, Jr. as a second guitarist.

The group released two EPs in 2007 and 2008 independently. In August 2009, the band signed to Tooth & Nail Records, on which they released their debut studio album Our Graceful Words in April 2010.  The album charted at No. 35 on Billboard Top Heatseekers. In support of the new album Sent by Ravens toured with artists like Papa Roach, Nonpoint, and Emery.

On February 28, 2012, the band released their second studio album, Mean What You Say.

Since their hiatus began on August 1, 2012, several members of the band have joined/formed other bands. In October 2012, Riner and Leonard announced that they had formed a punk rock band called Bad Talk, which they would be pursuing full time. They have recorded two demos which can be found on the band's Facebook page. In December 2012, "We're All Liars" was named the No. 1 Song of 2012 on TVU's Ten Most Wanted Countdown.

Brave Future (2017-)
In 2017, Riner and Windham went on to work on a project called "Brave Future" working and writing with producer David Bendeth on an EP of songs that can be found on here Spotify.

On February 13, 2018, Brave Future released their lead single "Down Here". On April 2, 2018, a second single "Reinvent" was released.

Members

Final Lineup
 Zach Riner — vocals
 Jon Arena - bass guitar
 Andy O'Neal — lead guitar
 James "JJ" Leonard Jr. — rhythm guitar, backing vocals
 Dane Andersen — drums

Former Members
 James (Jamie) Windham — bass guitar
 Aaron Moses — drums 
 Derick Ward — drums

Discography

Studio albums

EPs

Singles

Music videos

 "Trailers Vs Tornado"
 "New Fire"
 "We're All Liars"

References

External links
 
 

Christian rock groups from South Carolina
American post-hardcore musical groups
Musical groups established in 2006
2006 establishments in South Carolina
Tooth & Nail Records artists